There are a variety of different museums in Toronto. Types of museums located in Toronto include agricultural museums, art museums, fashion museums, food museums, history museums (including historic houses and living museums), military museums (including local regimental museums), railway museums, science museums, and textile museums.

Current museums
The following is a list of museums current located in Toronto. The following list does not include virtual museums that do not have physical galleries, regardless if they're based in Toronto.

Non-permanent museums
 of Toronto is a "pop-up" museum that provides exhibitions throughout the Greater Toronto Area, and does not have a physical location. It attempts to celebration the evolution of local communities, cultures, and urban and natural spaces of Toronto.

Theatre Museum Canada presently hosts travelling exhibits in various venues in Toronto. The museum's administrative offices are located in Toronto. In 2011, the museum announced it would move into a permanent facility at 355 King Street West. The museum would be situated inside the King Blue condominium development in the Entertainment District.

Former museums

Relocated
The following table includes museums whose facilities were formerly located in Toronto, although have since moved beyond the city limits.

Defunct
The following list includes former museums in Toronto that were closed.

See also
 List of museums in Canada
 List of museums in Ontario

Notes

References

External links 

Ontario Museum Association

 Toronto
Toronto
Toronto
Toronto
Museums in Toronto